Diuris dendrobioides, commonly known as the wedge diuris, is a species of orchid which is endemic to eastern Australia. It has one or two leaves and a flowering stem with up to six pale lilac-coloured to mauve flowers with darker markings.

Description
Flowering occurs from September to January.

Taxonomy and naming
Diuris dendrobioides was first formally described in 1882 by Robert FitzGerald from a specimen collected near Murrumburrah and the description was published in his book Australian Orchids. The specific epithet (dendrobioides) refers to a resemblance of this orchid to a species of Dendrobium. The Latin ending -oides means "resembling" or "having the form of".

This species is listed in the Index Kewensis as a synonym of Diuris punctata var. punctata.

Distribution and habitat
The wedge diuris grows amongst grasses in forest. It is widespread in the eastern half of New South Wales but is rare in Victoria, occurring only near Wodonga.

Conservation
Diuris dendrobioides is listed as "Endangered" in the Victorian Flora and Fauna Guarantee Act 1988.

References

 

dendrobioides
Endemic orchids of Australia
Orchids of New South Wales
Flora of Victoria (Australia)
Plants described in 1882